Patriki is a village in the Famagusta District of Cyprus, located on the Karpas Peninsula. It is under the de facto control of Northern Cyprus.

History
The village has been under Turkish occupation since the 1974 invasion. The village used to be inhabited by Greek-Cypriots. In his book Historic Cyprus (second edition 1947) Rupert Gunnis (who was Inspector of Antiquities on the island at the time) wrote:

Pre-1974, the main church used by the Greek-Orthodox villagers was Archangelos Michail, however it was desecrated by the Turks post-1974 and has been used as a mosque since. The smaller church of Agios Georgios is in a bad state, being desecrated also and used to store fertilizer for agriculture. The village has two chapels, those of Agios Prodromos and Panagia Trypimeni, both of which also stand in a state of desecration and disrepair.

In popular culture
Patriki is the home village of Kyriacos Panayiotou, the father of English singer George Michael.

Notable people
 

Philipos C. Loizou (1965–2012), university professor

References

Communities in Famagusta District
Populated places in İskele District